The 1939 Loyola Wolf Pack football team was an American football team that represented Loyola College of New Orleans (now known as Loyola University New Orleans) as a member of the Dixie Conference during the 1939 college football season. In their third season under head coach Larry Mullins, the team compiled a 5–5 record. At the conclusion of the season, Loyola discontinued the football program citing financial losses.

Schedule

References

Loyola
Loyola Wolf Pack football seasons
Loyola Wolf Pack football